Sushanto Tripura is a Bangladeshi footballer who plays as a right back for the Bangladesh national team and Abahani Limited Dhaka.

International career
On 5 October 2018, Sushanto made his senior career debut against Philippines during 2018 Bangabandhu Cup.

Honours
Bashundhara Kings
 Bangladesh Premier League: 2020–21,2018–19
 Federation Cup: 2020–21

Abahani Limited Dhaka
 Independence Cup: 2021–22
 Federation Cup: 2021–22

References 

1995 births
Living people
Bangladeshi footballers
Bangladesh international footballers
Bangladesh youth international footballers
Association football defenders
Footballers at the 2018 Asian Games
Bashundhara Kings players
Asian Games competitors for Bangladesh
Farashganj SC players
Abahani Limited (Dhaka) players
Abahani Limited (Chittagong) players
Feni SC players
Bangladeshi Hindus
People from Cox's Bazar District
Bangladesh Football Premier League players